A latmiyat is a Muharram ritual expressing grief through poetry with thumping of the chest, usually done by Shia muslims. While it is known as latmiya, latmaya, or latmia in Arabia-Persian countries, it is known in India and Pakistan as matam or matam-dari/sina aannee (chest beating). A latmiyat may also incorporate clapping, which expresses joy, while chest-thumping expresses sadness. Latmiyas are often done in remembrance of the martyrdom of Husayn ibn Ali, the grandson of Muhammad.

Latmiyas are a part of the Mourning of Muharram, which is a set of rituals commemorating the Battle of Karbala (AD 680/AH 61), and the martyrdom of Husayn ibn Ali (grandson of Muhammad) by the forces of Ubayd Allah ibn Ziyad.

See also 
Hussainia
Holy Week
Mourning of Muharram
Azadari in Lucknow

References 

 
Hussainiya
Shia Islam